The 1999 FESPIC Games, officially known as the 7th FESPIC Games, was an Asia-Pacific disabled multi-sport event held in Bangkok, Thailand from 10 to 16 January 1999, 20 days after the 1998 Asian Games. It was one of the two FESPIC Games to have held at the same host city as the Asian Games, the other being the 2002 FESPIC Games in Busan, South Korea.

It was the first time Thailand hosted the games. Thailand is the sixth FESPIC organisation member to host the FESPIC games after Japan, Australia, Hong Kong, Indonesia and China. Around 2,258 athletes from 34 nations competed at the games which featured 464 events in 15 sports. The games was opened by the Crown Prince of Thailand, Maha Vajiralongkorn at the Thammasat Stadium.

Development and preparation

Venues

Thammasat University (Rangsit Centre)
 Main Stadium (opening and closing ceremonies, Athletics and Football 7-a-side)
 Aquatic Center (Swimming)
 Gymnasium 1 (Wheelchair Basketball, Boccia)
 Gymnasium 2 (Badminton)
 Gymnasium 3 (Sitting Volleyball)
 Gymnasium 4 (Fencing)
 Gymnasium 5 (Table tennis)
 Gymnasium 6 (Goalball)
 Gymnasium 7 (Judo) 
 Field 2 (Archery)
 Field 3 (Wheelchair Tennis)
 Basketball Practicing Gymnasium (Powerlifting)

Huamark
 Shooting Range (Shooting)

Symbols

The emblem of the 1999 FESPIC Games is a graphic design of a disabled person surging forward on a speeding wheelchair under a Thai gable, which symbolizing the strong determination of the participating disabled athletes to achieve victory at the games.

The mascot of the 1999 FESPIC Games is an unnamed female siamese cat in a wheelchair bearing a flaming torch with its tail, represents the Games being the 7th edition of the FESPIC Games.

The games

Opening ceremony
The opening ceremony featured a card stunt performed by 8,000 students from the Jaturamitr Samakkee football competition.

Sports

  Archery
  Athletics
  Powerlifting
  Badminton
  Bowling
  Boccia
  Fencing
  Football 7-a-side
  Judo
  Shooting
  Swimming
  Sitting volleyball
  Table tennis
  Wheelchair basketball
  Wheelchair tennis

Medal table

See also
 1998 Asian Games

References

External links
 1999 FESPIC Games Official website

FESPIC Games
FESPIC Games
FESPIC Games
FESPIC Games
International sports competitions hosted by Thailand
Multi-sport events in Thailand
Asian Para Games
FESPIC Games
FESPIC Games
FESPIC Games